Goals Soccer Centres is an operator of dedicated 5-a-side football centers based in California, with around 50 locations.

History
Goals Soccer Centers originated from its British namesake in 1987 when Keith Rogers, founder of Goals and its previous CEO, opened the world's first 5-a-side football centre in Glasgow, Scotland under the brand name of Pitz. After subsequent expansion across the United Kingdom, Rogers stepped down from the UK business in January 2016 and relocated to the US to become President of Goals USA and opened his first two US-based sites in South Gate and Pomona in the mid 2010s and thereafter signed contracts for sites in Rancho-Cucamonga and Covina. Rogers subsequently left Goals in January 2017 to launch a new US based business.

On July 25, 2017, City Football Group - owners of Major League Soccer club New York City FC and Premier League side Manchester City - signed a joint venture partnership with the Scottish company to invest capital into the US operations of the company in order to expand across the continent. Although Goals doubled their total locations to four by December 2018, further expansion plans were halted in 2019 after the company ran into financial troubles. Three months later, Goal's stake in the US joint venture was sold to partners City Football Group, giving the soccer organisation full control of the company.

Man City Soccer Academy
As a result of its links to Manchester City, Goals sites operate Manchester City-branded soccer schools, where children can register to receive coaching from City coaches and learn to play with City tactics.

References

External links

Soccer in the United States
City Football Group
Privately_held_companies_based_in_California